Two Ferret-class destroyers served with the Royal Navy.  and  were built by Laird, displaced 280 tons and were  in overall length.

Armament
They were armed with one 12-pounder and three 6-pounder guns, and three torpedo tubes (two on deck mounts and one fixed bow tube).  The bow tube was soon removed, and provision was made for removing the deck tubes and substituting two extra 6-pounder guns. They carried a complement of 42 (later raised to 53).

Background
The invention of the self-propelled torpedo by Robert Whitehead and Austrian Navy Captain Giovanni Luppis in 1866, combined with the introduction of  small fast torpedo boats posed a threat to battleships: large numbers of torpedo boats could overwhelm a battleship's defences and sink it, or distract the battleship and make it vulnerable to opposing capital ships. Torpedo boats proved devastatingly effective in the 1891 Chilean Civil War.

The defence against torpedo boats was clear: small warships accompanying the fleet that could screen and protect it from attack by torpedo boats. Several European navies developed vessels variously known as torpedo boat "catchers", "hunters" and "destroyers", while the Royal Navy itself operated torpedo gunboats.  However, the early designs lacked the range and speed to keep up with the fleet they were supposed to protect. In 1892, the Third Sea Lord, Rear Admiral Jackie Fisher ordered the development of a new type of ships equipped with the then novel water-tube boilers and quick-firing small calibre guns.

Orders
Six ships to the specifications circulated by the Admiralty were ordered initially, comprising three different designs each produced by a different shipbuilder:

Design
These boats all featured a turtleback (i.e. rounded) forecastle that was characteristic of early British TBDs. All six of them were removed from service and disposed of by the end of 1912, and thus were not affected by the Admiralty decision in 1913 to group all the surviving 27-knot and 30-knot destroyers (which had followed on these six 26-knot vessels) into four heterogeneous classes, labelled "A", "B", "C" and "D" classes.

The Ferret-class destroyers were followed by the larger  which were built by Lairds less than a year later.

Bibliography

 

Destroyer classes
 
Ship classes of the Royal Navy